Aljezur is a parish (freguesia) in the municipality of Aljezur in Portugal. The population in 2011 was 3,365, in an area of 166.76 km².

The area consists of Vale da Telha, Arrifana, Espartal, Vales, and Picao de Baixo

Archaeological sites confirm man's presence in the area since prehistoric times, most notably for a period around 4,000 BC and during the Bronze Age. The name Aljezur comes from Aljuzur, the Arabic meaning of Islands. Overlooking the town is a ruin of a Moorish fortress. A visit on the hill and learning about the function and history of this historic monument can be combined with a visit to one of the local museums.

See also 
 Castle of Aljezur
 Aljezur River

References

Freguesias of Aljezur